Tverrbytthornet is a mountain in Lom Municipality in Innlandet county, Norway. The mountain is surrounded by several other notable mountains including Kyrkja and Kyrkjeoksli to the south; Tverrbottindene to the northwest; Store Bukkeholstinden to the north; Bukkeholshøi to the northeast; Nørdre Hellstugutinden to the east; and Urdadalstindene, Semelholstinden, and Visbretinden to the southeast.

See also
List of mountains of Norway by height

References

Jotunheimen
Lom, Norway
Mountains of Innlandet